Ago Anderson (born 8 April 1972 in Pärnu) is an Estonian actor.

Since 1994 he is working at Endla Theatre. He has also played in several films and television series.

Selected roles in films and television series
 1995 Wikmani poisid (television series)
 2005 Malev (film)
 2008 Tuulepealne maa (television series)
 2011-2012 Kälimehed (television series)
 2012–2013 Ment (television series)
 2014 Keskea rõõmud (television series)
 2016 Polaarpoiss (film)
 2016 Klassikokkutulek (film)
 2020 Sipsik (animated film)
 2021 Süü (television series)
 2023 Suvitajad (film)

Roles in theatre

References

Living people
1972 births
Estonian male stage actors
Estonian male television actors
Estonian male voice actors
Estonian male film actors
20th-century Estonian male actors
21st-century Estonian male actors
Estonian Academy of Music and Theatre alumni
People from Pärnu